Khleborob is a rural locality (a settlement) in Abramovskoye Rural Settlement, Talovsky District, Voronezh Oblast, Russia. The population was 72 as of 2010.

Geography 
Khleborob is located 40 km northeast of Talovaya (the district's administrative centre) by road. Abramovka is the nearest rural locality.

References 

Rural localities in Talovsky District